Oba-na! was a Soviet and Russian comedy television program that aired on Channel One and ATV from November 1990 until June 1995.

The first episode of Oba-na! was aired on November 19, 1990.

Oba-na! was one of the most progressive and courageous comic programs. The program has become famous for a plot under the name "Funeral of meal" (an actual joke of 1991).

The program fell victim to repeated attempts at censorship by The USSR State Committee for Television and Radio Broadcasting and would often by forced off the air.

Oba-na! Became the first winner of the Gold Ostap premium.
The actors from "Oba-na" sung the Soviet national anthem in a Jazz/rock style.
The last episode of Oba-na! was aired in June 1995.

Channel One Russia original programming
1990 Russian television series debuts
1995 Russian television series endings
Russian comedy television series
1990s Russian television series